Sardar Muhammad Shafiq Tareen is a Pakistani politician who has been a Member of the Senate of Pakistan, since March 2018.

Political career
Sardar Shafiq Tareen is Affiliated to Pashtoonkhwa Milli Awami Party . He was elected as Tehsil Nazim Dukki in 2007 local bodies election. He also contested the General Elections in 2013 and stood runner up. Tareen was elected to the Senate of Pakistan as an independent candidate on general seat from Balochistan in 2018 Pakistani Senate election. He took oath as Senator on 12 March 2018.

References

Living people
Members of the Senate of Pakistan
Year of birth missing (living people)